The  (the Hellenized form of ) was a high-ranking court position of the middle Byzantine Empire.

History and functions 
The title is also found in seals of the 7th and 8th centuries, but with a different sense; thus a " of Calabria" was the administrator of the local estates of the See of Rome in Calabria.

The Kletorologion of 899 includes the  among the 'special dignities'. The exact functions of the office are not clear, but, as J. B. Bury wrote, they probably "consisted in exercising some authority over the Imperial household". His ceremony of appointment is recorded in Constantine VII's De Ceremoniis.

The title disappears from the sources after the reign of Constantine IX Monomachos.

List of known rhaiktores

References

Sources
 
 
 
 
 

Byzantine palace offices
Byzantine court titles